Chạo tôm is a traditional Vietnamese dish that comes from the Huế region of Central Vietnam. It consists of shrimp surimi grilled on a sugar cane stick. It is often presented as a dish during large banquets prepared for weddings, holidays, or similar special events.

See also
 List of seafood dishes

References

.
 .

Culture in Huế
Shrimp dishes
Sugar
Vietnamese seafood dishes